Rob Hammond is the former mayor of Monrovia, California. He is a registered Republican.

Hammond was elected mayor in 2003 and getting re-elected in 2005 and 2007. Prior to being elected mayor, he was a member of the Monrovia City Council since 1997. His accomplishments include being a representative to the Gold Line phase II Joint Powers Authority, a representative to the Independent Cities Association and the Independent Cities Risk Management Authority, a liaison to the Library Board and a representative to the Los Angeles County Sanitation District. He is also active with the U.S. Conference of Mayors.

Hammond is married to his wife Kathy, and they have two children, Michael and Christine. He is also the owner of Monrovia Jewelry and Loan in Downtown Monrovia.

References

External links
Official Monrovia website profile

Living people
Mayors of places in California
People from Monrovia, California
California Republicans
Year of birth missing (living people)